After the Japanese invasion of Manchuria, and until 1933, large volunteer armies waged war against Japanese and Manchukuo forces over much of Northeast China.

Due to Chiang Kai-shek's policy of non-resistance, the Japanese were soon able to establish complete control. After the League of Nations refused to do more than voice its disapproval, there were many small guerrilla organizations which resisted Japanese and Manchu rule:
 Jilin Self-Defence Army
 Chinese People's National Salvation Army
 Northeastern Volunteer Righteous and Brave Fighters
 Northeastern Loyal and Brave Army
 Northeast People's Anti-Japanese Volunteer Army
 Northeast Anti-Japanese National Salvation Army
 Northeast Anti-Japanese United Army
 Heilongjiang National Salvation Army
 Anti-Japanese Army for the Salvation of the Country

Besides these armies there were other forces under leaders like Lao Pie-fang and others. Zhao Hong Wenguo was influential in supporting some armies such as the Iron and Blood Army, with many of her children participating in Anti-Japanese insurgent activities.

For the whole year of 1932 the Japanese had to occupy themselves with fighting these  Chinese forces in various areas of Manchuria. Gen. Ma Zhanshan, nominally in command of them all, had a total fighting force estimated by the Japanese at 300,000 men. Following their defeat, many retreated into Rehe and other places in China. The remainder were forced to disperse their remnants into small units, often called shanlin. Ongoing Japanese "Anti-Bandit" campaigns and other "pacification" measures steadily reduced the number of insurgents. Their numbers declined from 120,000 in 1933 to 50,000 in 1934; 40,000 in 1935; 30,000 in 1936; and 20,000 in 1937. As of September 1938, the number of insurgents was estimated by the Japanese at 10,000.

From 1935 the Northeast Anti-Japanese United Army, under the leadership of the Chinese Communist Party, absorbed many of these volunteer forces into its own ranks.

See also
 Resistance movement
 Resistance during World War II
 Soviet partisans
 Yugoslav Partisans
 Croatian Partisans
 Macedonian Partisans
 Serbian Partisans
 Slovene Partisans
 The March of the Volunteers
 Red Spear Society
 Second Sino-Japanese War

References

Sources 
 Hsu Long-hsuen and Chang Ming-kai, History of The Sino-Japanese War (1937–1945) 2nd Ed., 1971. Translated by Wen Ha-hsiung, Chung Wu Publishing; 33, 140th Lane, Tung-hwa Street, Taipei, Taiwan Republic of China.
 Jowett, Phillip S., Rays of The Rising Sun, Armed Forces of Japan's Asian Allies 1931-45, Volume I: China & Manchuria, 2004. Helion & Co. Ltd., 26 Willow Rd., Solihull, West Midlands, England.
Coogan, Anthony, The volunteer armies of Northeast China, History Today; July 1993, Vol. 43 Issue 7, pp.36-41
Notes On A Guerrilla Campaign, from http://www.democraticunderground.com accessed November 4, 2006

Anti-Japanese sentiment in China
Anti-Japanese Volunteer Armies